Jean Marie Donovan (April 10, 1953 – December 2, 1980) was an American lay missionary who was beaten, raped, and murdered along with three fellow missionaries—Ita Ford, Maura Clarke and Dorothy Kazel—by members of the military of El Salvador.

Early life
Jean Donovan was born to Patricia and Raymond Donovan, who raised her in an upper middle-class home in Westport, Connecticut.  She had an older brother, Michael. She attended Mary Washington College in Virginia (now the University of Mary Washington), and spent a year as an exchange student in Ireland at University College Cork, deepening her Catholic faith through her contact with a priest there who had been a missionary in Peru.

Upon the completion of her master's degree in business from Case Western Reserve University, she accepted a position as a management consultant for the Cleveland branch of the nationwide accounting firm, Arthur Andersen.

Donovan was engaged to a young physician, Douglas Cable, and felt a strong call to motherhood as well as her call to do mission work: "I sit there and talk to God and say 'Why are you doing this to me? Why can't I just be your little suburban housewife?'

While volunteering in the Cleveland Diocese Youth Ministry with the poor, she decided to join the Diocesan Mission Project in El Salvador. She was accepted into and completed the lay-missionary training course at Maryknoll in New York State.

Donovan traveled to El Salvador in July 1977, where she worked as a lay missioner in La Libertad, along with Dorothy Kazel, an Ursuline nun. The pair worked in the parish of the Church of the Immaculate Conception in La Libertad, providing help to refugees of the Salvadoran Civil War and the poor. They provided shelter, food, transportation to medical care, and they buried the bodies of the dead left behind by the death squads.

Donovan was a follower of Archbishop Óscar Romero, and often went to his cathedral, the Catedral Metropolitana de San Salvador, to hear him preach. After his assassination on March 24, 1980, about eight months before their own murders, she and Sister Dorothy Kazel stood beside his coffin during the night-long vigil of his wake.

In the weeks before she died, Donovan wrote a friend:

Murder

References

Further reading
 Hearts on Fire: The Story of the Maryknoll Sisters, Penny Lernoux, et al., Orbis Books, 1995.
 Salvador Witness: The Life and Calling of Jean Donovan, Ana Carrigan, Ballantine Books, 1986.
 The Same Fate As the Poor, Judith M. Noone, Orbis Books, 1995. 
 Witness of Hope: The Persecution of Christians in Latin America, Martin Lange and Reinhold Iblacker, Orbis Books, 1981.

External links
 Justice & The Generals: U.S. Law – Trial History supporting material for documentary first aired on PBS. Accessed October 7, 2005.
 Plant a Tree in Jean Donovan's Memory El Salvador memorial project in honor of the four churchwomen; accessed online December 9, 2006.
 Report of the Commission on the Truth for El Salvador (1993) accessed online June 27, 2012.

1953 births
1980 deaths
People from Westport, Connecticut
People from Fredericksburg, Virginia
University of Mary Washington alumni
Roman Catholic activists
American Roman Catholic missionaries
Female Roman Catholic missionaries
Catholic martyrs of El Salvador
Roman Catholic missionaries in El Salvador
Assassinated American activists
American people murdered abroad
People murdered in El Salvador
People of the Salvadoran Civil War
20th-century Roman Catholic martyrs
Deaths by firearm in El Salvador
Burials in Florida
1980 murders of U.S. missionaries in El Salvador
Catholics from Virginia
Catholics from Connecticut